John Davenport (January 16, 1752 – November 28, 1830) was a United States representative from Connecticut.

Biography
Born in Stamford in the Connecticut Colony, he pursued academic studies, and graduated from Yale College in 1770. He engaged in teaching there in 1773 and 1774; he also studied law and was admitted to the bar in 1773, practicing in Stamford. He was a member of the Connecticut House of Representatives from 1776 to 1796, and served in the commissary department of the Continental Army during the Revolutionary War, attaining the rank of major in 1777.

Davenport was elected as a Federalist to the Sixth and to the eight succeeding Congresses, serving from March 4, 1799 to March 3, 1817. He was chairman of the Committee on Revisal and Unfinished Business during the Seventh Congress. He declined to be a candidate for reelection in 1816 and died in Stamford in 1830; interment was in North Field (now Franklin Street) Cemetery.

James Davenport, John's brother, also represented Connecticut in the House as a Federalist.

References
 Retrieved on 2009-05-22

1752 births
1830 deaths
Continental Army staff officers
Members of the Connecticut House of Representatives
Politicians from Stamford, Connecticut
Yale College alumni
Federalist Party members of the United States House of Representatives from Connecticut
Deans of the United States House of Representatives